This article contains information about the literary events and publications of 1829.

Events
January 26 – The first performance of Douglas Jerrold's comic nautical melodrama Black-Eyed Susan; or, All in the Downs is held at the Surrey Theatre in Lambeth, London. It will run for a new record of well over 150 performances.
January 29 – The first complete performance of Goethe's Faust: The First Part of the Tragedy (1808), adapted by August Klingemann, in Braunschweig.
September – The narrative of George Eliot's novel Middlemarch (1871–1872) opens.
October 29 – The English actress Fanny Kemble makes her stage debut as Juliet in Shakespeare's Romeo and Juliet, at her father's Theatre Royal, Covent Garden in London.
December — John Neal publishes the final issue of The Yankee literary journal.
unknown dates
Louis Braille invents a new alphabet and embossed printing that allows the blind to read.
The Raczyński Library in Poznań is opened to the public.

New books

Fiction
Edward Bulwer-Lytton – Devereux
Honoré de Balzac – Les Chouans
Steen Steensen Blicher – The Rector of Veilbye (Præsten i Vejlbye)
William Nugent Glascock – Sailors and Saints, or Matrimonial Manœuvres
Johann Wolfgang von Goethe – Wilhelm Meister's Journeyman Years, or The Renunciants (Wilhelm Meisters Wanderjahre, oder Die Entsagenden)
Catherine Gore – Romances of Real Life
Gerald Griffin – The Collegians
Victor Hugo – The Last Day of a Condemned Man (Le Dernier Jour d'un condamné)
Washington Irving – Chronicle of the Conquest of Granada
George Payne Rainsford James – Richelieu
Julia Pardoe – Lord Morcar of Hereward
Thomas Love Peacock (anonymously) – The Misfortunes of Elphin
Walter Scott (anonymously) – Anne of Geierstein

Children
Frederick Marryat – The Naval Officer, or Scenes in the Life and Adventures of Frank Mildmay

Drama
Johann Wolfgang von Goethe – Faust (performed)
Victor Hugo – Marion Delorme
Douglas William Jerrold – Black-Eyed Susan
John Augustus Stone – Metamora; or, The Last of the Wampanoags

Poetry
Edgar Allan Poe – Al Aaraaf, Tamerlane and Other Poems
Alfred Tennyson – Timbuctoo
Henrik Wergeland
Digte, første Ring (Poems, first circle)
Skabelsen, Mennesket og Messias (Creation, Man and the Messiah)

Non-fiction
Hans Christian Andersen – A Journey on Foot from Holmen's Canal to the East Point of Amager (Fodrejse fra Holmens Canal til Østpynten af Amager i Aarene 1828 og 1829)
Thomas Carlyle – Signs of the Times
William Cobbett
The English Gardener
Advice to Young Men
Samuel Taylor Coleridge – On the Constitution of Church and State
Encyclopedia Americana, vol. 1 (1st edition)
Washington Irving – Chronicle of the Conquest of Granada
Cornelio Saavedra – Memoria autógrafa
Philip Stanhope, Viscount Mahon – Life of Belisarius
David Walker – Walker's Appeal, in Four Articles; Together with a Preamble, to the Coloured Citizens of the World, but in Particular, and Very Expressly, to Those of the United States of America

Births
January 1 – Tommaso Salvini, Italian memoirist and actor (died 1915)
January 12 – Rosanna Eleanor Leprohon, née Mullins, Canadian novelist and poet (died 1879)
February 24 – Friedrich Spielhagen, German novelist (died 1911)
April 26 – Eva Brag, Swedish poet, novelist and journalist  (died 1913)
March 4 – Samuel Rawson Gardiner, English historian (died 1902)
May 1 – José de Alencar, Brazilian novelist (died 1877)
June 4 – Jane Lippitt Patterson, American writer and editor (died 1919)
July 19 – Helen Vickroy Austin, American essayist, journalist, and horticulturist (died 1921)
October 31 – Emma Tatham, English poet (died 1855)
September 12 – Charles Dudley Warner, American essayist and novelist (died 1900)
September 18 – Edna Dean Proctor, American poet and author (died 1923)
September 25 – William Michael Rossetti, English critic (died 1919)
November 21 – Martha Perry Lowe, American writer and activist (died 1902)
December 8 – Henry Timrod, American poet (died 1867)

Deaths
January 6 – Josef Dobrovský, Czech historian (born 1753)
January 11 – Karl Wilhelm Friedrich von Schlegel, German poet and critic (born 1772)
January 15 – John Mastin, English memoirist, local historian and cleric (born 1747)
January 29 – István Pauli (Pável) Hungarian Slovene priest and writer (born 1760)
February 11 – Aleksander Griboyedov, Russian dramatist (killed by mob, born 1795)
July 7 – Jacob Friedrich von Abel, German philosopher (born 1751)
July 23 – Wojciech Bogusławski, Polish playwright and director (born 1757)
September 29 – Pierre Étienne Louis Dumont, political writer (born 1759)
October 10 – Maria Elizabetha Jacson, English writer on botany and gardening (born 1755)

Awards
Newdigate prize – Robert Stephen Hawker

References

 
Years of the 19th century in literature